Howard Scott Gordon (1924–2019) was a Canadian economist. His seminal 1954 article Economic Theory of a Common Property Resource: The Fishery marked the beginning of the modern economics study of fisheries.
He spent most of his career teaching and writing in the history and philosophy of economics.

Life 
Gordon was born in Halifax, Nova Scotia. He gained his undergraduate degree from Dalhousie University in 1944. He was an economics graduate student at Columbia University and McGill University.

He was a lecturer in economics at McGill in 1947-1948. He then joined the recently established Carleton College (now Carleton University) in Ottawa. He helped found the Economics Department at Carleton University and chaired the department from 1948 to 1966. He was a professor at the department of economics at Indiana University from 1966 to 1988. He chaired the Economics Department at IU from 1970 to 1973. From 1983 he had a split appointment with the History and Philosophy of Science Department. He retired in 1988.

Gordon taught summer courses in the history of economic theory at Queen's University from 1970 until 1996.

Fishing quotas 
Scott's most well-known and seminal research on the tragedy of the commons was found in a 1954 Journal of Political Economy paper The Economic Theory of Common Property Resource: The Fishery. The role of individual fishing quotas (IFQs), also known as "individual transferable quotas" (ITQs), was shown by Gordon in his original research about fishing economics.

Honors and legacy 
Gordon's students included Margaret Schabas, and J. Alfred Broaddus. In Welfare, Property Rights and Economic Policy - Essays and Tributes in Honour of H. Scott Gordon by T.K. Rymes the author celebrates Gordon as one of "Canada's most distinguished social scientist and economics scholars." Rymes' book was cited in the International Journal of Transport Economics (1993). Gordon was a Guggenheim Fellow for the academic year 1964–1965. For the period of 1977-1978, Gordon served as president of the Canadian Economics Association. His papers are in an archival repository at Indiana University. John Davis of Marquette University reviewed History of Philosophy of Social Science by H.Scott Gordon in the Southern Economic Journal.

Articles

Books

References

External links
H. Scott Gordon papers, 1947-1993

1924 births
2019 deaths
Indiana University faculty
21st-century  Canadian economists
20th-century  Canadian economists